Benjamin B. Patterson (August 15, 1910 – July 5, 1986) was an American businessman and politician.

Patterson was born in Hibbing, St. Louis County, Minnesota. He received his bachelor's degree in commerce from University of North Dakota and then went to graduate school at University of Minnesota in 1966. He lived with his wife and family in Deer River, Itasca County, Minnesota. Patterson was the owner of the Pine Resort in Deer River, Minnesota. He served as the administrative assistant to the Secretary of the Minnesota Senate from 1957 to 1962. Patterson then served in the Minnesota Senate from 1963 to 1966. In 1970, Patterson suffered a stroke and in 1971, he moved to Rochester, Minnesota. He died at the Methodist Hospital in Rochester, Minnesota.

References

1910 births
1986 deaths
People from Hibbing, Minnesota
People from Itasca County, Minnesota
Politicians from Rochester, Minnesota
University of Minnesota alumni
University of North Dakota alumni
Businesspeople from Minnesota
Employees of the Minnesota Legislature
Minnesota state senators